Branešci may refer to:

 Branešci, Serbia, a village near Čajetina, Serbia
 Branešci, Croatia, a village near Pakrac, Croatia
 Branešci Donji, a village near Čelinac, Bosnia and Herzegovina
 Branešci Gornji, a village near Čelinac, Bosnia and Herzegovina